Jean-François Yvon (born 24 November 1958) is a French racing driver.

Racing record

24 Hours of Le Mans results

References

1958 births
Living people
French racing drivers
24 Hours of Le Mans drivers

OAK Racing drivers